Alexander Georgiyevich Tishanin (born April 20, 1966) was the Head of the Administration of Ust-Orda Buryat Autonomous Okrug from January 26 to December 31, 2007 and the Governor of Irkutsk Oblast from September 8, 2005 to April 15, 2008.

Tishanin was appointed by Vladimir Putin. Tishanin was working as a manager before he became governor. He graduated from Chelyabinsk railways technical school, the Urals Engineering Institute of railway transport, and State Railways University.

References
Lenta.Ru.  Alexander Tishanin Profile 

1966 births
Living people
People from Troitsk, Chelyabinsk Oblast
Governors of Irkutsk Oblast
Russian Presidential Academy of National Economy and Public Administration alumni